Mahjong or mah-jongg is a tile-based game that was developed in the 19th century in China and has spread throughout the world since the early 20th century. It is commonly played by four players (with some three-player variations found in parts of China, Japan, South Korea and Southeast Asia). The game and its regional variants are widely played throughout East and Southeast Asia and have also become popular in Western countries. The game has also been adapted into a widespread online entertainment. Similar to the Western card game rummy, mahjong is a game of skill, strategy, and luck. To distinguish it from mahjong solitaire, it is sometimes referred to as mahjong rummy.

The game is played with a set of 144 tiles based on Chinese characters and symbols, although many regional variations may omit some tiles or add unique ones. In most variations, each player begins by receiving 13 tiles. In turn, players draw and discard tiles until they complete a legal hand using the 14th drawn tile to form four melds (or sets) and a pair (eye). A player can also win with a small class of special hands. While many variations of mahjong exist, most variations have some basic rules in common including how a piece is drawn and discarded, how a piece is robbed from another player, the use of suits (numbered tiles) and honors (winds and dragons), the basic kinds of melds allowed, how to deal the tiles and the order of play. Beyond these basic common rules, numerous regional variations exist which may have notably different criteria for legal melds and winning hands, radically different scoring systems and even elaborate extra rules. A group of players may introduce their own house rules which can notably change the feel of play.

Etymology 
In Chinese, the game was originally called meaning sparrowwhich is still used in some languages in southern China. It is said that the clacking of tiles during shuffling resembles the chattering of sparrows. It has also been suggested that the name came from an evolution of an earlier card game called Madiao from which mahjong tiles were adapted. Most Mandarin-speaking Chinese now call the game  (májiàng). Its name is similar in other languages, except in Thai, where it is called (phai nok krachok), a calque meaning "sparrow cards".

Old Hong Kong mahjong rules 

There are many highly varied versions of mahjong both in rules and tiles used. "Old Hong Kong mahjong" uses the same basic features and rules as the majority of the different variations of the game. This form of mahjong uses all of the tiles of the most commonly available sets, includes no exotic complex rules, and has a relatively small set of scoring sets/hands with a simple scoring system. For these reasons Hong Kong mahjong is a suitable variation for the introduction of game rules and play and is the focus of this article.

Game equipment 

Old Hong Kong mahjong is played with a standard set of 144 mahjong tiles (though cards may be used). Sets often include counters (to keep score), dice (to decide how to deal), and a marker to show who the dealer is and which round is being played. Some sets include racks to hold the tiles, especially if they are larger or smaller than standard tiles or have an odd shape. Mahjong sets originating from the United States, Japan or Southeast Asia will likely have extra tiles or specialized markings.

The tiles are split into three categories: suited, honors, and bonus tiles.

Suited tiles 
Suited tiles are divided into three suits and each are numbered from 1 to 9. The suits are bamboos, dots, and characters. There are four identical copies of each suited tile totaling 108 tiles.

The bamboo suit is also known as "sticks", "strings" or "bams" suit; the first tile usually has a bird (traditionally, a peacock or sparrow) instead of a single bamboo. The dots suit is also known as the "wheels", "circles", "coins", "stones", "marbles" or "balls" suit. The characters suit is also known as the "myriads", "cracks" or "numbers" suit since the top characters are numbers in the Chinese orthography, and the bottom characters (in traditional Chinese characters) are the Chinese orthography of "ten thousand".

Honors tiles 
There are two different sets of honors tiles: winds and dragons. The winds are east, south, west, and north, beginning with east. The dragons are red, green, and white. The white dragon has a blue or black frame on the face of the piece or in some sets is entirely blank. These tiles have no numerical sequence like the suited tiles (for example the bamboo pieces number 1 to 9). Like the suited tiles, there are four identical copies of each honors tile, for a total of 28 honors tiles.

Bonus tiles 
There are two sets of bonus tiles: flowers and seasons. The flower and season tiles play a unique role in the mechanics of the game. When drawn, the bonus tile is not added into a player's hand but are instead set aside and kept near the player's other tiles for scoring purposes should they win the hand, and an extra tile is drawn in replacement of the bonus tile.

In addition, unlike the suited and honours tiles, there is only a single tile of each bonus tile, so there are a total of four flower and four season tiles in the set. The tiles have a different artistic rendering of a specific type of flower or season.

It is not necessary to know the names or the Chinese characters of each bonus tile, only the number, as this is associated with a specific direction, and the player receives bonus points when the bonus tile matches the seat direction. There is no relation between the bonus tile "bamboo" flower and the bamboo suit of suited tiles (e.g. 4 bamboo). In traditional Chinese culture, the Four Gentlemen are the plum (winter), orchid (spring), bamboo (summer), and chrysanthemum (autumn) which are regarded as the representative plants of those seasons, but people regard it as plum blossom (spring), orchid (summer), chrysanthemum (autumn) and bamboo (winter) now.

Choosing table positions and first dealer 

The dealer is chosen by various means. For example, each player throws dice with the highest count taking the dealer position, second-highest taking south etc. Or one player may place one tile of each wind face down and shuffle them. Each player randomly select one of these tiles and these tiles dictate their wind position. Each player sits down at their respective position (called the wind position) at the table in positions of an inverted compass: East is dealer, the right of the dealer is South, across is West, and the left is North. The order of play is traditionally counter-clockwise.

Hands, rounds, and matches 

A match consists of four rounds, each representing a "prevailing wind", starting with East. Once the first round is completed, a second round begins with South as the prevailing wind, and so on. Wind position is significant in that it affects the scoring of the game. A mahjong set with winds in play will usually include a separate prevailing wind marker (typically a die marked with the wind characters in a holder).

In each round at least four hands are played, with each player taking the position of dealer. In the first hand of each round, Player 1 (winner of the dice toss) is East and therefore dealer. In the second hand, Player 2 takes the East position, shifting the seat winds amongst the players counterclockwise (though players do not physically move their chairs). This continues until all four players have been East (dealer). A marker is used to mark which player is East and often the round number. (In sets with racks, a rack may be marked differently to denote the dealer.)

Whenever a player in the East position (dealer) wins a hand, or if there is no winner (a draw or "goulash hand"), an extra hand is played with the same seating positions and prevailing wind as in the previous hand. This means that a match may potentially have no limit to the number of hands played (though some players will set a limit of three consecutive hands allowed with the same seat positions and prevailing wind).

Example of games:

Dealing tiles

Shuffling tiles

All tiles are placed face down on the table and are shuffled. By convention all players should participate in shuffling using both hands moving the pieces around the table rigorously and loudly for a lengthy period. Tiles may get flipped up during this process and players should flip them facing down as soon as possible to avoid identifying the location of the revealed tiles.

Stacking tiles

Each player then stacks a row of 18 tiles, two tiles high in front of them (for a total of 36 tiles). Players then push each side of their stack together to form a square wall.

Regular players usually place their stacks in a slightly diagonal position (about 20 to 30 degrees anti-clockwise); the right end of their stack is pushed slightly further in to the centre of the table to meet almost the middle of the stack of the player on the right. This creates a smaller square wall the length of about half of each stack, with walls extended away from each corner of the square. The diagonally positioned stacks and a smaller square creates a bigger space for players' tiles and also makes an ergonomic position for drawing tiles from the stack.

Drawing tiles

The dealer throws three dice in the square wall and sums up the total. Counting anti-clockwise so that the dealer is 1 (or 5, 9, 13, 17), so that south (player to the right) is 2 (or 6, 10, 14, 18), etc., a player's quarter of the wall is chosen. Some house rules may use only two dice but have double throws to increase randomness. In the case of double throws, the player of the chosen wall makes the second throw.

Using the same total on the dice (or the total of the two throws), the player whose wall is chosen then counts the stacks of tiles from right to left. (For double throws, the count may extend to the left side player's stack.) This determines the location where the 'deck' of tiles is cut. Starting from the left of the stacks counted, the dealer draws four tiles for himself, and players in anti-clockwise order draw blocks of four tiles until all players have 12 tiles, so that the stacks decrease clockwise. Each player then draws one last tile to make a 13-tile hand. The tile to be drawn is always the topmost tile left of the cut.

Dealing does not have to be strictly this way and may be done quite differently based on house rules. Tiles may flip over when being dealt and players should agree in advance on how to deal with the problem. Solutions include having the dealer penalised points, shuffling the turned over piece back into the wall somehow, allowing the player to whom the tiles were dealt to take the piece or not (meaning the dealer must take it as his/her 14th piece), or other house rules.

Each player now sets aside any flowers or seasons they may have drawn and takes turns to draw replacement tiles from the wall in the anti-clockwise direction from the dealer. If a player gets any flowers or seasons tiles in the replacement draw, the players must wait for the next turn to draw replacement tiles.

Game play starts
The dealer draws a piece from the wall in clockwise direction, adding it to their hand. Typically, this draw is performed during the initial deal to speed up play. If this does not complete a legal hand, the dealer then discards a piece (throwing it into the middle of the wall with no particular order in mind).

Rules 

Each player in turn, in counterclockwise direction, draws a tile from the wall; as long as the tile drawn is not one of the bonus tiles, the player proceeds to discard a tile (either the tile just drawn, or a tile in the hand) to maintain a hand of 13. The discarded tile is thrown into the centre and, if desired, the player announces out loud what the piece is. The other players have an opportunity to seize the discarded tile; if no one takes it, the turn continues to the next player. Play continues this way until one player has a legal winning hand and calls out the win (each region does this call differently--no Asian version uses the word "mahjong" to signal a win) while revealing their hand.

There are four different ways that regular order of play can be interrupted:
A bonus tile (flower or season) is drawn
A meld (pong, kong, or chow) is made from a discard
Going mahjong (declaring a winning hand)
Robbing a kong

During play, each player's hand should always be 13 tiles (meaning in each turn a tile must be picked up and another discarded). The count of 13 tiles do not include any bonus tiles (flowers and seasons), which are set to the side, nor does it include the fourth added piece of a kong. If a player is seen to have fewer or more than 13 tiles in their hand outside of their turn they are penalised.

Legal hand 
A winning hand consists of 14 tiles. Since players always have 13 tiles in their hand during play, they must win by either drawing a piece from the wall that completes a 14-tile hand ("winning from the wall") or claiming a discard from another player which completes a 14-tile hand ("winning by discard"). The winning hand is made of four melds (a specific pattern of three pieces) and the eyes (a pair of identical pieces). The exceptions to this rule are the special hands listed below.

Most players play with a table minimum, meaning a winning hand must score a minimum number of points (which can be seen in the scoring section). In Hong Kong mahjong the most common point set is three, but can be higher or lower depending on house rules.

Melds 
Melds are groups of tiles within the player's hand, consisting of either a pong (three identical tiles), a kong (four identical tiles), a chow (three suited tiles all of the same suit, in numerical sequence), or eyes (two identical tiles needed in a winning hand). Melds may be formed by drawing a tile from the wall, or by seizing another player's discard. There are rules governing which player has priority for a discard, and whether the meld should be exposed (displayed to all players) or remain concealed, depending on the manner in which the meld is formed.

Interruption of play 
The regular anti-clockwise order of turns may be interrupted for four events:

1. Flower or season 
Whenever a player draws a flower or season, it is announced and then placed to the side (it is not considered a part of the 13-tile hand, but in the event that player wins, they may earn bonus points for them) and the last tile of the wall is drawn as a replacement tile so that the player has the 14 pieces needed before their discard. This may happen successively in a player's turn.

2. Melding another player's discard 
When a player discards a tile, other players may steal the tile to complete a meld. Stealing tiles has both advantages (quickly forming a winning hand and scoring extra points) and disadvantages (being forced to reveal part of one's hand to other players and not being able to change the meld once declared).

When a meld (pong, kong, or chow) is declared through a discard, the player must state the type of meld to be declared and expose the meld by placing the three (or four) tiles face up. The player must then discard a tile, and play continues to the right. If the player who melds a discard is not directly after the discarder (in order of play), one or two players will essentially miss their turn as play continues anti-clockwise from the player who declared the meld.

If multiple players call for a discarded tile, priority for the discard depends on the declared action of the player stealing the discard.

 Highest priority goes to the player who needs the discarded tile to win the hand. A player may take the tile to win the hand from any other player.
 Next priority goes to the player who declares a pong or kong using the discard. A player who calls for a pong or kong may take the discard from any other player. Only one player can be in this position because there are only four of any tile in a mahjong set.
 Last priority goes to the player who declares a chow using the discard. Players may only call for a chow from the discard of the player immediately prior to them unless the tile is the final one required to win the hand.

3. Winning a hand 
The act of winning a hand interrupts play to assess the validity of the hand won. Upon confirmation, the player is awarded the hand's value per the specific game's rule.

From a discard
If at any point in the game a player can use another player's discard to complete a legal hand (and with the agreed minimum points), they declare a win and reveal their winning hand. This ends the hand, and scoring commences. If more than one player can use a discard to win the hand, multiple ways can handle the situation based on agreed table rules: The players might count the points they would win with the discard and the winner is the one with the higher score, the winner might simply be the player closest to the discarder in order of turn, or multiple players may be granted the win simultaneously.

From the wall
Alternatively, a player may also win by drawing a tile that completes a legal hand. This is called "winning from the wall". In Hong Kong mahjong, winning from the wall doubles the number of base points each loser must pay.

False Win
Technically, the declaration for winning a hand may be done at any time. However, the player must have a complete and legal hand. Otherwise, the player is penalized. The penalty depends on table rules. The player may forfeit points to the other players. Another potential penalty is the player who called out the false win must play the rest of the hand with their tiles face up on the table so other players can see them (open hand). Some methods apply the penalty at the end of the entire game. Again, the table rules dictate the enforcement of the penalty.

4. Robbing a kong 
A rarely occurring and high-scoring feature of Hong Kong mahjong is a move called robbing the kong. If a player declares a kong by adding a fourth piece to a melded pong but another player can use that piece to complete a hand, the completing player takes priority to win the hand and may steal that piece from the player who intended to declare the kong.

Examples of winning hands 
Below are two examples of winning hands. A winning hand must consist of four melds (pongs, kongs, or chows) and a pair (eyes) and must also score the agreed table minimum.

Most players include table variations in their games, of which some non-standard are included. The hands of seven different pairs and 13 orphans are examples which do not have four melds and the eyes. They are described in more detail below.

Repeated hands 

If the dealer wins the hand, they will remain the dealer and an extra hand is played in addition to the minimum 16 hands in a match.

An extra hand is also played if there is no winner by the time all the tiles in the wall have been drawn. When there is no winner it is known as a "goulash hand". Depending on table rules, the winner of the next game may take an agreed number of points from each player, carrying over the points from the non-winning hand to the winning one. If there are two or three goulash hands in a row then the winner would collect a considerable number of points from each player on top of their scoring hand. Because extra hands may be played every time a dealer wins or if there is a goulash hand, a match of 16 hands can easily become a match of 20 or even much more.

As table rules add a large amount of flexibility for players, they can choose to disregard the rule of extra hands and pass on the dealership regardless of who wins or if it results in a goulash hand. This puts a maximum estimated limit on the game duration and provides some amount of predictability.

Rhythm of play
Players may agree on table rules if the pace of the game is brisk or leisurely. For brisk games players may agree that a couple seconds after a discard are allowed for a "window of opportunity" before the next player picks up from the wall. Usually it is agreed once the next player has waited the duration of the "window of opportunity" and draws a tile from the wall, the previous discard is lost and cannot be claimed.

Scoring 

Old Hong Kong scoring is relatively simple. There is only one winner (or if there is a draw the hand is replayed). The winner must have a legal hand that meets the minimum faan points agreed to in advance (not including any bonus points). Only the winner scores, the other players pay the winner various sums. After each hand ends, the winner counts all of his or her faan points.
 Faan points depend on:
 The composition of the entire hand
 How the hand was won
 Bonus tiles
 Special patterns
 A few other special criteria.
 In order to win, a player needs to have at least the minimum faan value agreed in advance (often 3). Bonus tiles and a few other elements are not included in the minimum faan value a player needs to form a legal winning hand. For example, in a three faan minimum game, if a player has two faan points and one bonus point, the player has not met the proper requirements to win and will need to gain another faan point before calling a win. Though the bonus points cannot be included in the minimum points needed to win, they are included in the overall score after a player wins.
 The other players do not score their hand. Once the winner has added his or her points (faan points plus bonus points) they must be converted into base points (the chart is below). These base points represent how much the opponents pay to the winner
 Players then pay the winner (in money or when not gambling with "chips or points") based on three factors:
 The base points (faan points and bonus points converted into a payment unit)
 If the player won from the wall (doubles the points)
 If the player was the dealer (doubles the points).

Concealed vs. revealed meld and hand 

A concealed meld is one that contains no tiles stolen from another player's discard. A concealed hand is one made up of only concealed melds. Many variations distinguish between a concealed hand (winning from the wall) and a semi concealed hand (the last tile is a stolen discard). In most mahjong variations having a concealed hand can be valuable in scoring. Hong Kong mahjong does not award concealed melds/hands as generously as others. Concealed hands only the case with a few limit hands or half-limit hands (thirteen orphans, heavenly gates, four concealed pongs) as well as a complete hand (seven pairs) and over several melds (three concealed pongs).

Faan value

Basic faan value 
A winning hand must include an agreed minimum amount of faan value (often 3). Some examples of scoring include:

Bonus faan 

A player only scores a bonus faan for flowers or seasons if it is their own flower or season (East=1, South=2, West=3 and North=4) or if the player has all four flowers or all four seasons (scoring 5 faan in total).

Payment 

The losers pay the winning player points based on several criteria and depending on whether the game is for fun or for money. How points are reckoned is agreed by players beforehand. For example, they can keep a tally, exchange chips, or pay one another with money. The faan value of a hand is converted into base points which are then used to calculate the points the losers pay the winner. The table is progressive, doubling the number of base points when reaching a certain faan point target. The following is the Old Hong Kong simplified table; for other tables, see Hong Kong mahjong scoring rules.

This table is based on play where 3 faan is the minimum needed in order to win with a legal hand. If a player has 3 faan, then their hand is worth one base point. A winning hand with 9 faan is worth four base points. Losing players must give the winning player the value of these base points. The following special cases result in doubled base points:
 If the winner wins from the wall, their base points are doubled.
 If the hand was won by discard, the discarder doubles the amount they owe the winner.
 If the winner is east, all losers double the base points.
 If the east player is a losing player, they pay double the points to the winner.

If two of these criteria apply to any player, they must double and then redouble the points owed to the winner.

Examples 

Hong Kong mahjong is essentially a payment system of doubling and redoubling, where winning from the wall adds great value to the final payment and where the dealer is highly rewarded or penalised if they win or lose.

Limit hands 
In Hong Kong mahjong there are a series of "limit hands". These are exceptional hands, difficult to obtain and are very valuable in point scoring. As many table rules put a limit on the number of points a winner's hand can score, full limit hands score that maximum. Table rules dictate if these rare and special hands are allowed, which ones, and the limit for scoring. A common scoring limit is 64 points, which is the highest base points doubled twice. A winner receives the scoring limit from each player without any doubling.

Some limit hands by necessity must be completely concealed (not discards used) or semi-concealed (the only discard used is the one needed to win). This includes the 13 orphans, 4 concealed pongs, heavenly hand and earthly hand. It is usually expected that the heavenly gates hand be concealed or semi-concealed. As for the dragon limit hands and the great winds, table rules dictate whether the hand must be concealed or not. Some table rules claim that a semi-concealed hand (winning from a discard) scores a half-limit.

Some groups also play with the "great flowers" rule. If a player picks up all four flowers and all four seasons during their hand, they instantly win the hand and receive the maximum points from all of the players. This is exceptionally rare.

In all the hands that require pongs, each pong can be replaced by the corresponding kong.

Other examples of high-scoring hands

Variations 

Variations may have far more complicated scoring systems, add or remove tiles, and include far more scoring elements and limit hands.

In many places, players often observe one version and are either unaware of other variations or claim that different versions are incorrect. In mainland China alone, there are over thirty variants. Many variations today differ only by scoring.

Chinese variants
 Changsha mahjong is widely played in Hunan Province. Like Wuhan mahjong, players need to obtain special Jong consisting of only tiles of two, five or eight. Changsha mahjong forbids using winds and some special tiles, those tiles are first drawn out from the table when playing. Winners each round get a special drawing session for bonuses, usually doubling the score.
 Chinese classical mahjong is the oldest surviving variety of mahjong and was the version introduced to America in the 1920s under various names. It has a small, loyal following in the West, although few play it in Asia. All players score and it is possible to score higher than the winner.
 Competition mahjong is an international standard founded by All-China Sports Federation in July 1998 that some mahjong societies have adopted for competition play and in some cases for all play. It includes a large variety of different scoring rules in a way that emphasizes strategy and calculation ability.
 Fujian mahjong, thirteen tile hands. Certain tiles can be wild. No dragons. Winds are treated as bonuses.
 Harbin mahjong, popular in northeastern China, using only 108 suit and 4 red dragon tiles. The player's hand must meet a set of few conditions (e.g. at least one chow / pong, at least one terminal or red dragon, etc.) and be declared "ready" in order to win, with points earned by discard or self-draw and a bonus tile revealed when the player wins.
 Hong Kong mahjong or Cantonese mahjong is a more common form of mahjong, differing in minor scoring details from the Chinese Classical variety. It does not allow multiple players to win from a single discard.
 Shenyang mahjong using 13 hands in a game, and Shenyang mahjong has a very fast speed on playing. Also in Shenyang mahjong, the player must have bamboos, characters, circles and number 1 or 9 in their hand. In addition, the players have to pong before they chow, so there is no chance to win even if some players win at the first time they have their hands in hand.
  is a growing variety, particularly in southern China, disallowing chi melds, and using only the suited tiles. Play continues until a loser is decided or a draw. It can be played very quickly.
 , or Lisi: the players must win with the first four blocks drawn which are placed separately in front of the others. These four blocks cannot be touched until the player has a ready hand.
  using normally seven jokers, with special scoring such as joker-free, joker-waiting-pair, catch-5, dragon, joker-suited-dragon.
 Wuhan mahjong is growing rapidly and become popular in southern China. It is different from other parts of China such that it has a tile that can be used as everything called Laizi, and the player has to have a set of special two tiles, namely two, five, eight, as prerequisite for winning. Another variation has become the new trend. Special tiles need to be discarded.
 Xiangyang mahjong is played with three players, and without winds, seasons, flowers and one suit of dots, bamboo and characters. It places special emphasis on the 5 tile giving extra points for any hand made using a 5 tile.

Other variants
 American mahjong is a form of mahjong standardized by the National Mah Jongg League and the American Mah-Jongg Association. It uses joker tiles, the Charleston, plus melds of five or more tiles, treats bonus tiles as honors, and eschews the chow and the notion of a standard hand. Legal hands are changed annually. Purists claim that this makes American mahjong a separate game. In addition, the NMJL and AMJA variations, which have minor scoring differences, are commonly referred to as mahjongg or mah-jongg (with 2 Gs, often hyphenated).
 Filipino mahjong, sixteen tile hands. Certain tiles can be wild. Honors are treated as bonuses.
  is the variety prevalent in Taiwan and involves hands of sixteen tiles (as opposed to the thirteen-tile hands in other versions), features bonuses for dealers and recurring dealerships, and allows multiple players to win from a single discard.
 Japanese classical mahjong is still used in tournaments. It is closer to the Chinese classical scoring system but only the winner scores.
 Japanese Mahjong is a standardized form of mahjong in Japan and South Korea, and is also found prevalently in video games. In addition to scoring changes, the rules of rīchi (ready hand) and dora (bonus tiles) are unique highlights of this variant. In addition, tile discards are specifically arranged in front of each player by discard order, to take discarded tiles into account during play. Some rules replace some number 5 tiles with red tiles so that they can eventually get more value.
 Korean mahjong is unique in many ways and is an excellent version for three players. One suit is omitted completely (usually the bamboo set or 2–8 of bamboo) as well as the seasons. The scoring is simpler and the play is faster. No melded chows are allowed and concealed hands are common. Riichi (much like its Japanese cousin) is an integral part of the game as well.
 Pussers bones is a fast-moving variant developed by sailors in the Royal Australian Navy. It uses an alternative vocabulary, such as Eddie, Sammy, Wally, and Normie, instead of East, South, West, and North respectively.
 Singaporean mahjong are two similar variants with much in common with Hong Kong mahjong. Unique elements of Singaporean mahjong are the use of four animal bonus tiles (cat, mouse, cockerel, and centipede) as well as certain alternatives in the scoring rules, which allow payouts midway through the game if certain conditions (such as a kong) are met. Melds may also be presented in a form different from most other variations.
 South African mahjong is a variant of Cantonese mahjong. It is very similar in terms of game play and follows most of the rules and regulations of Cantonese mahjong. However, there are some minor differences in scoring, e.g. the limit on the maximum points a hand can be rewarded is three or four faan depending on the house rules. A chicken hand (gai wu) is normally considered a value hand. Depending on the house rules flowers may also be used to boost scoring.
 Thai mahjong has eight specialized jokers with eight extra flowers and eight animals for a total of 168 tiles.
 Vietnamese mahjong has the same eight specialized jokers but with only eight different extra flowers for a total of 160 tiles. A modern variant triplicates or quadruplicates the jokers for a total of 176 or 184 tiles.
 Western classical mahjong is a descendant of the version of mahjong introduced by Babcock to America in the 1920s. Today, this term largely refers to the "Wright-Patterson" rules, used in the U.S. military, and other similar American-made variants that are closer to the Babcock rules.
 Three player mahjong (or 3-ka) is a simplified three-person mahjong that involves hands of 13 tiles (with a total of 84 tiles on the table) and may use jokers depending on the variation. Any rule set can be adapted for three players; however, this is far more common and accepted in Japan, Korea, Malaysia and the Philippines. It usually eliminates one suit entirely, or tiles 2–8 in one suit leaving only the terminals. It needs fewer people to start a game and the turnaround time of a game is short—hence, it is considered a fast game. In some versions there is a jackpot for winning in which whoever accumulates a point of 10 is considered to hit the jackpot or whoever scores three hidden hands first. The Malaysian and Korean versions drop one wind and may include a seat dragon.

Equipment

Tables 

Mahjong playing surfaces are typically square and small enough to be within arm's length of all equipment. The edges are raised to prevent tiles from sliding off and the surface is covered in felt to limit wear on the tiles. Automatic dealing tables, often used for high stakes playing and tournaments, are able to shuffle tiles, build walls, and randomize dice. It is an elaborate device built into a table which uses two alternating sets of tiles. It prepares one wall while the players play one hand. After the hand is finished the tiles are dropped into the table and a new wall raises upwards.

Tiles
The following chart shows the most generic set of tiles

There are variations that feature specific use of tiles. Some three-player versions remove the North wind and one Chinese provincial version has no honors. Korean mahjong removes the bamboo suit or at least its numbers 2–8 so that terminals can be used. Japanese mahjong rarely uses flowers or seasons. The seasons are removed in Korean mahjong, while many Southeast Asian sets have more flower series.

Wild cards and jokers 

Some mahjong variants accept wildcard tiles. The wildcard tiles are decided at the beginning of the game by choosing one random tile. The wild card could be the immediately following tile on the wall, after distributing tiles to all players, or it could also be separately decided by a dice throw. Wildcard tiles cannot be discarded and can only replace tiles in chows. Wildcard tiles cannot replace tiles in pongs and kongs. For example, if a character 4 is chosen, then character 4 and the next sequential tile, character 5, can be used as wild cards in this round. (When the wildcard indicator is chosen and exposed, only 3 tiles remain of the same denomination, so the next tile in the suit will also be used as a wildcard, adding to 7 wildcard tiles for 4 players.) Also, if a tile numbered 9 is the indicator, the suits circle back to 1, after 9. Thus, the number 9 and 1 are wild cards.

Also, if the chosen tile is not in the suited tiles, the wild cards are decided in rules:

The bonus tiles are not available for wild cards.

A feature of several variations of mahjong, most notably in American mahjong, is the notion of some number of Joker tiles. They may be used as a wild card: a substitute for any tile in a hand, or, in some variations, only tiles in melds. Another variation is that the Joker tile may not be used for melding. Depending on the variation, a player may replace a Joker tile that is part of an exposed meld belonging to any player with the tile it represents.

Rules governing discarding Joker tiles also exist; some variations permit the Joker tile to take on the identity of any tile, and others only permit the Joker tile to take on the identity of the previously discarded tile (or the absence of a tile, if it is the first discard).

Joker tiles may or may not affect scoring, depending on the variation. Some special hands may require the use of Joker tiles (for example, to represent a "fifth tile" of a certain suited or honor tile).

In American mahjong, it is illegal to pass Jokers during the Charleston.

Flowers 
Japanese rule sets discourage the use of flowers and seasons. Korean rules and three-player mahjong in the Korean/Japanese tradition use only flowers. In Singapore and Malaysia an extra set of bonus tiles of four animals are used. The rule set includes a unique function in that players who get two specific animals get a one-time immediate payout from all players. In Taiwanese mahjong, getting all eight flowers and seasons constitutes an automatic win of the hand and specific payout from all players.

Four of the flower tiles represent the four noble plants of Confucian reckoning:
 🀢 plum,
 🀣 orchid,
 🀥 chrysanthemum,
 and 🀤 bamboo.

   

The other 4 flower tiles (or season tiles) represent seasons:
 🀦 spring,
 🀧 summer,
 🀨 autumn,
 and 🀩 winter.

   

These animal tiles are used in Thailand, Malaysia, Singapore and local variations. They represent the cat, mouse, rooster and centipede. Like flower tiles, they also function as bonus tiles. However, as they have no corresponding seat position, any player who draws one of these gets a bonus point.

Walls 
All tiles are placed face down and shuffled. Each player then stacks a row of tiles two tiles high in front of them, the length of the row depending on the number of tiles in use:
 136 tiles: 17 stacks for each player
 Suits of circles, bamboos, and characters + winds + dragons
 144 tiles: 18 stacks for each player
 148 tiles: 19 stacks for dealer and player opposite, 18 for rest
 152 tiles: 19 stacks for each player

Dice, markers, and counting pieces

Depending on the variation, two or three dice are usually used to decide what part of the wall to start dealing from. They are six-sided dice, traditionally but not necessarily Chinese dice with red one and four pips.

The dealer marker is a round or square object that the dealer places to the side to remind players who the dealer is. The wind marker may be used which indicates the current prevailing wind. In some cases the dealer marker and the wind marker are represented by one large marker, usually a small wheel where one can swivel the outer circle to indicate the prevailing wind (which the dealer holds onto), a cube with the four winds placed onto four of the sides which can be placed in a hollow square (the dealer holds onto it), or a cylinder locked into frame which can be rolled to expose the wind on the top. Japanese mahjong, especially in a gambling environment, may optionally use four yakitori markers to indicate which players have not won a hand yet and has to pay a penalty.

There are a variety of counting pieces used in different countries. They range from Chinese or Japanese counting sticks (thin sticks with various dots on them to represent various points), jetons, play money, paper and pencil, or various apps on touchscreen devices used to calculate and keep scores.

Rules 
Japanese and Korean mahjong have some special rules. A player cannot win by a discard if that player had already discarded that piece, where players' discards are kept in neat rows in front of them. Players may declare ready, meaning that they need one tile to win, cannot change their hand and win extra points if they win. Some rules may replace some of the number 5 tiles with red tiles, as they can earn more points. Korean mahjong does not allow melded (stolen) chows.
Taiwanese mahjong adds three tiles to a hand requiring a 5th set to be formed, making a clean hand or all-pong hand very difficult to procure.
American mahjong has distinctive game mechanics and the article on American mahjong details these. Some differences include many special patterns, a different scoring system and the use of jokers and five-of-a-kind.

Charleston 
In the American variations it is required that, before each hand begins, a Charleston be enacted. In the first exchange, three tiles are passed to the player on one's right; in the next exchange, the tiles are passed to the player opposite, followed by three tiles passed to the left. If all players are in agreement, a second Charleston is performed; however, any player may decide to stop passing after the first Charleston is complete. The Charleston is followed by an optional pass to the player across of one, two, or three tiles. The Charleston, a distinctive feature of American mahjong, may have been borrowed from card games such as Hearts.

Hands 
Many variations have specific hands, some of which are common while some are optional depending on regions and players. One example is the Pure Green hand made of chows or pongs using 2, 3, 4, 6, 8 of bamboo and green dragon.

Ready hands 
The player holding a ready hand is said to be waiting for certain tiles. It is common to be waiting for two or three tiles, and some variations award points for a hand that is waiting for one tile. In 13-tile mahjong, the largest number of tiles for which a player can wait is 13 (the thirteen wonders, or 13 orphans, a nonstandard special hand). Ready hands must be declared in some variations of mahjong, while other variations prohibit the same.

Some variations of mahjong, most notably Japanese and Korean ones, allow a player to declare . A declaration of rīchi is a promise that any tile drawn by the player is immediately discarded unless it constitutes a win. Standard requirements for rīchi are that the hand be closed or have no melds declared (other than a concealed kong) and that players already have points for declaration of rīchi. A player who declares rīchi and wins usually receives a point bonus for their hand directly, and a player who won with rīchi also has the advantage to open the inner dora which leads to higher possibilities to match such a card, thus has more chance to grant additional bonus. However, a player who declares rīchi and loses is usually penalised in some fashion. Declaring a nonexistent rīchi is also penalised in some way.

In some variations, a situation in which all four players declare a rīchi is an automatic drawn game, as it reduces the game down to pure luck, i.e., who gets their needed tile first.

Draws 
If only the dead wall remains (or if no dead wall exists and the wall is depleted) and no one has won, the hand is drawn or "goulashed". A new hand begins, and depending on the variant, the Game Wind may change. For example, in most playing circles in Singapore, if there is at least one kong when the hand is a draw, the following player of the dealer becomes the next dealer; otherwise, the dealer remains dealer.

Japanese mahjong has a special rule called sanchahō, which is, if three players claim the same discard in order to win, the hand is drawn. One reason for this is that there are cases in which bars of 1,000 points for declaring rīchi cannot be divided by three. The rule is treated the same as "abortive draws".

Abortive draws 
In Japanese mahjong, rules allow abortive draws to be declared while tiles are still available. They can be declared under the following conditions:
 On a player's first turn when no meld has been declared yet, if a player has nine different terminal (also known as major) or honor tiles, the player may declare the hand to be drawn (for example, but could also go for the nonstandard thirteen wonders hand as well).
 Four winds' barrier: On the first turn without any meld declarations, if all 4 players discard the same Wind tile, the hand is drawn.
 Yonin rīchi: If all four players declare rīchi, the hand is drawn.
 Four kongs' abort: The hand is drawn when the fourth kong is declared, unless all four kongs were declared by a single player. Still, the hand is drawn when another player declares a fifth kong.

Scoring
Scoring in mahjong involves points, with a monetary value for points agreed upon by players. Although in many variations scoreless hands are possible, many require that hands be of some point value in order to win the hand.

While the basic rules are more or less the same throughout mahjong, the greatest divergence between variations lies in the scoring systems. Like the rules, there is a generalized system of scoring, based on the method of winning and the winning hand, from which Chinese and Japanese base their roots. American mahjong generally has greatly divergent scoring rules, as well as greatly divergent general rules.

Because of the large differences between the various systems of scoring (especially for Chinese variants), groups of players will often agree on particular scoring rules before a game.

Points
Points (terminology of which differs from variation to variation) are obtained by matching the winning hand with different criteria scoring different values. The points obtained may be modified into scores for each player using some (typically exponential) functions. Some criteria may be also in terms of both points and score.

In many variations the dealer receives no scoring bonus and does not maintain their turn by winning or a dead hand.

In classical mahjong all players score points. Points are given for sets and hand composition and winning bonuses, doubled and redoubled for basic patterns. Sometimes a loser may score more points than a winner. Japanese mahjong has a complex scoring system with several stages of scoring, rules and exceptions, evening out scores and bonus points at the end of a match. Korean mahjong has a simple scoring system where only winner scores without any form of doubling.

Some variations give points for concealed hands, in which case no melds are made except by winning on a discard.

In Old Hong Kong mahjong:
 Only the winner scores points.
 Winning hands are scored by totaling the point value of each element in the hand. Points are distinct from the actual payment received from each player.
 The winner receives points (also known as faan among some players) for:
 Individual melds,
 The composition of the entire hand,
 How the hand was won,
 Bonus tiles,
 Special patterns,
 A few other special criteria.
 In order to win, a player needs to have at least the minimum points agreed in advance (often 3).
 Bonus points are separate from the minimum points a player needs to win.
 If a player goes mahjong with a legal and minimum hand, their hand is scored by adding their points and bonus points together.
 The payment received from each player depends on three factors:
 The point value of the hand,
 If the player won from a discard or from the wall, and
 If the player was the dealer or not.

Comparison

Mahjong solitaire

A single player game employs the tiles of mahjong, usually played on computers or devices.  Gameplay is entirely unrelated to mahjong or its variations and is a recent invention. A two-player version was published by Nintendo. The game involves stacking tiles face up in various elaborate patterns and removing uncovered matching tiles at the end of rows.

Competition 

In 1998, in the interest of dissociating illegal gambling from Mahjong, the China State Sports Commission published a new set of rules, now generally referred to as Chinese Official rules or International Tournament rules (see Guobiao Majiang). The principles of the new, wholesome Mahjong are no gambling, no drinking, and no smoking. In international tournaments, players are often grouped in teams to emphasize that Mahjong from now on is considered a sport.

The new rules are highly pattern-based. The rulebook contains 81 combinations, based on patterns and scoring elements popular in classic and modern regional Chinese variants; some table practices of Japan have also been adopted. Points for flower tiles (each flower is worth one point) may not be added until the player has scored eight points. The winner of a game receives the score from the player who discards the winning tile, plus eight basic points from each player; in the case of zimo (self-drawn win), they receive the value of this round plus eight points from all players.

The new rules were first used in an international tournament in Tokyo, where, in 2002, the first global tournament in mahjong was organized by the Mahjong Museum, the Japan Mahjong Organizing Committee, and the city council of Ningbo, China. One hundred players participated, mainly from Japan and China, but also from Europe and the United States. Mai Hatsune, from Japan, became the first world champion. The following year saw the first annual China Mahjong Championship, held in Hainan; the next two annual tournaments were held in Hong Kong and Beijing. Most players were Chinese; players from other nations attended as well.

In 2005, the first Open European Mahjong Championship was held in the Netherlands, with 108 players. The competition was won by Masato Chiba from Japan. The second European championship in Copenhagen (2007) was attended by 136 players and won by Danish player Martin Wedel Jacobsen. The first Online European Mahjong Championship was held on the Mahjong Time server in 2007, with 64 players, and the winner was Juliani Leo, from the U.S., and the Best European Player was Gerda van Oorschot, from the Netherlands. The Third Open European Mahjong Championship 2009 at Baden/Vienna, Austria, was won by Japanese player Koji Idota, while runner-up Bo Lang from Switzerland became European Champion. There were 152 participants.

In 2006, the World Mahjong Organization (WMO) was founded in Beijing, China, with the cooperation of, amongst others, the Japan Mahjong Organizing Committee (JMOC) and the European Mahjong Association (EMA). This organization held its first World Mahjong Championship in November 2007 in the Chinese town of Chengdu, attended by 144 participants from all over the world. It was won by Li Li, a Chinese student at Tsinghua University. The next World Championship took place in Utrecht, the Netherlands, 27 to 29 August 2010.

Other major international tournaments include the Mahjong International League's World Mahjong Sports Games and the privately sponsored World Series Of Mahjong.

American mahjong tournaments are held in virtually every state—the largest is in Las Vegas, Nevada, twice a year, and in Atlantic City, New Jersey, by Mah Jongg Madness (MJM), and an annual cruise is hosted by the National Mah Jongg League and MJM. MJM tournaments host between 150 and 500 participants at these larger events; there are several smaller-scale, but equally successful, tournaments held annually by other hosts. Prize pools are based on the number participating. Rules are based on the National Mah Jongg League standard rules.

History 

Mahjong is based on draw-and-discard card games that were popular in 18th and 19th century China, some of which are still popular today. They were played with a stripped deck of money-suited cards. Each deck is divided into three suits of Cash or coins, Strings of cash, and Myriads of strings. There are nine ranks in each suit. In addition, there are three wild cards: Red flower, White flower, and Old thousand. Depending on the game, there are multiple copies of each card.

Games scholar David Parlett has written that the Western card games Conquian and Rummy share a common origin with Mahjong. All these games involve players drawing and discarding tiles or cards to make melds. Khanhoo is an early example of such a game. The most likely ancestor to Mahjong was pènghú which was played with 120 or 150 cards. During the late 19th century, pènghú was used interchangeably with máquè in both card and tile form.

It is not known when the conversion from cards to tiles took place precisely but it most likely occurred in the middle of the 19th century. The earliest surviving tile sets date to around 1870 and were acquired in Fuzhou, Shanghai, and Ningbo. These sets differ from modern ones in several ways. In the Glover sets, there were no "flower" and fā ("green dragon") tiles. In their place were "king" tiles for heaven, earth, man, and harmony and also for each of the 4 "winds" which may have acted as bonus tiles. In the contemporaneous Himly set, there were no zhōng ("red dragon") tiles either. Instead there were the wild cards known as Cash Flower, String Flower, and Myriad Flower plus an additional tile, the king of everything. These early jokers are still found in the Vietnamese and Thai sets. They may have been removed as the tiles share the same titles as the leaders of the Taiping Rebellion (1850–1864). For example, Hong Xiuquan was the self-styled "Heavenly King of Great Peace" and his top subordinates were called east king, south king, west king, and north king.

The ban on gambling after the founding of the People's Republic in 1949 led to a decline in playing. The game itself was banned during the Cultural Revolution (1966–1976). Today, it is a favorite pastime in China and other Chinese-speaking communities.

Mahjong in the West 

The first Western records about mahjong seem to correspond to the papers of British Consul General F.E.B. Harvey, around the time when he served as consul in Ningbo, during the 1860s. He mentions in his papers making the acquaintance of an English-fluent, rank-three official under the Daoguang Emperor, Chen Yumen, who taught him the game. In the same writings he details the rules he was taught by Chen. In 1895, British sinologist William Henry Wilkinson wrote a paper which mentioned a set of cards known in central China by the name of ma chioh, literally, hemp sparrow, which he maintained was the origin of the term Mahjong. He did not explain the dialect of the originator or region specific etymology of this information. By 1910, there were written accounts in many languages, including French and Japanese.

The game was imported to the United States in the 1920s. The first Mahjong sets sold in the U.S. were sold by Abercrombie & Fitch starting in 1920. It became a success in Washington, D.C., and the co-owner of the company, Ezra Fitch, sent emissaries to Chinese villages to buy every Mahjong set they could find. Abercrombie & Fitch sold a total of 12,000 Mahjong sets. Mahjong became a central part of cultural bonding for Chinese Americans in the 1920s and '30s in Chinatown, Manhattan and was part of community building for suburban American Jewish women in the 1940s and 50s.

Also in 1920, Joseph Park Babcock published his book Rules of Mah-Jongg, also known as the "red book". This was the earliest version of Mahjong known in America. Babcock had learned Mahjong while living in China. His rules simplified the game to make it easier for Americans to take up, and his version was common through the Mahjong fad of the 1920s. Later, when the 1920s fad died out, many of Babcock's simplifications were abandoned.

The game has taken on a number of trademarked names, such as "Pung Chow" and the "Game of Thousand Intelligences". Mahjong nights in America often involved dressing and decorating rooms in Chinese style. Several hit songs were recorded during the Mahjong fad, most notably "Since Ma Is Playing Mah Jong" by Eddie Cantor.

Many variants of Mahjong developed during this period. By the 1930s, many revisions of the rules developed that were substantially different from Babcock's classical version (including some that were considered fundamentals in other variants, such as the notion of a standard hand). Standardization came with the formation of the National Mah Jongg League (NMJL) in 1937, along with the first American Mahjong rulebook, Maajh: The American Version of the Ancient Chinese Game, written by NMJL's first president and co-founder, Viola L. Cecil. In 1999, a second organization was formed, the American Mah Jongg Association.

In the United Kingdom, British author Alan D. Millington revived the Chinese classical game of the 1920s with his book The Complete Book of Mah-jongg (1977). This handbook includes a formal rules set for the game.

Mahjong serves as a minor plot point in the 2016 American science fiction film Arrival where General Shang uses the game to interact with the aliens.

Current development 

There are many governing bodies which often host exhibition games and tournaments for modern and traditional Mahjong gaming.

Mahjong, as of 2010, is the most popular table game in Japan. As of 2008, there were approximately 7.6 million Mahjong players in Japan and an estimated 8,900 Mahjong parlors did ¥300 billion (converting to US$2.8 billion according to exchange rates for 30 April 2020) in sales. There are several manga and anime (e.g. Saki and Akagi) devoted to dramatic and comic situations involving Mahjong. Since the 1980s, hundreds of different Mahjong arcade machines in Japanese video arcades have been created, including strip versions. Newer units can connect with other arcade machines across the Internet.

Mahjong culture is still deeply ingrained in the Chinese community. Sam Hui wrote Cantopop songs using Mahjong as their themes, and Hong Kong movies have often included scenes of Mahjong games. Many gambling movies have been filmed in Hong Kong, and a recent subgenre is the Mahjong movie.
Although the popularity of the game in China is still broad, since 1949, mahjong was frowned upon by the government because it is seen as a means of gambling addiction, an issue that the government always sought to tackle.

Prolonged playing of Mahjong may trigger epileptic seizures according to a 2007 study. To date there are 23 reported cases of Mahjong-induced seizures in the English medical literature. Some doctors speculate that this may be due to stress and complex manual movement correlated with intense brain function similar to playing chess or card games such as poker.

Studies by doctors have also shown in Hong Kong that the game is beneficial for individuals suffering from dementia or cognitive memory difficulties, leading to the development of Mahjong therapy.

Researchers have also used artificial intelligence techniques to develop Mahjong-playing agents using neural networks and reinforcement learning. They have shown that a self-learning machine can be trained to compete with some of the best Richi Mahjong players.

Mahjong was also adapted into several puzzle video games such as Mahjong Trails, listed as one of the top-grossing games on Facebook.

Superstitions 
Even though both skill and chance play a fundamental role in the game, there is no shortage of superstitions in which players believe where they sit, how they hold their pieces or objects they have on their person will somehow affect the outcome. For example, players will try to find seats with the best feng shui or wear their lucky clothing or trinkets. Some believe that specific pieces (one dot, for example) bode bad luck if received in their opening hand.

More elaborate superstitions in mahjong range from those found in the game poker, such as not counting one's wins and losses, to the comical, such as changing one's undergarments after a loss. As with all superstitions in gaming, none of them have been properly demonstrated as effective, though, for some, the rituals have become an integral part of the game experience and its aesthetics.

Glossary

Heavenly Hand (天糊)
Great Winds (大四喜)
Great Dragons (大三元)
All Kongs (十八羅漢)
All Honor Tiles (字一色)
Thirteen Orphans (十三幺)
Nine Gates Hand (九蓮宝燈)
Self Triplets (四暗刻)
All in Triplets (對對糊)
Mixed one suit (混一色)
All one suit (清一色)
Common Hand (平糊)
Small Dragons (小三元)
Small Winds (小四喜)

Unicode 

Mahjong tiles were added to the Unicode Standard in April, 2008 with the release of version 5.1.

The Unicode block for Mahjong tiles is U+1F000–U+1F02F:

See also 

 Mahjong tiles
 Mahjong video game
 Singaporean Mahjong scoring rules
 Khanhoo
 Madiao
 Chinese playing cards
 Mah-Jongg (lemur), a pet owned by the Courtaulds

References

Notes

Further reading 

 Lo, Amy. The Book of Mahjong: An Illustrated Guide. Tuttle Publishing: 2001.
Zhou, H. X. & Wang, Y. L. (2002). The Origin and Development of Mahjong. Journal Of Ningbo University(Liberal Arts Edition)
Rep, J. (2007). The great mahjong book: History, lore and play. North Clarendon, VT: Tuttle Pub..
 Oxfeld, Ellen, Blood, Sweat, and Mahjong: Family and Enterprise in an Overseas Chinese Community. Cornell University Press: 1993. .
 Pritchard, David B., Teach Yourself mahjong. McGraw-Hill/Contemporary: 2001. .
 Sloper, Tom., Mah-Jongg: Game of the Orient. Self-published: n.d.
 Wright Patterson Mah Jongg Group, Mah Jongg; Wright-Patterson Rules. Wright Patterson Mah Jongg Group: 1963.

Historical research 

 Culin, Stewart, ‘The Game of Ma-Jong, its Origin and Significance’. In: Brooklyn Museum Quarterly, Brooklyn, NY, Vol. XI, 1924, p. 153–168. Also found at; Gamesmuseum.uwaterloo.ca
 Depaulis, Thierry, ‘Embarrassing Tiles: Mahjong and the Taipings’. In: The Playing-Card, Vol. 35, No. 3, 2007, pp. 148 – 153.
 Ebashi, Takashi, ‘Proto Mahjong. Mahjong Tiles in the 19th Century’. In: Mahjong Museum Report, Vol. 5, No.2, Issue 9, April 2005, pp. 14 – 17 (in Japanese).
 Lo, Andrew, ‘China’s Passion for Pai: Playing Cards, Dominoes, and Mahjong’. In: Asian Games: The Art of Contest, Colin Mackenzie and Irving Finkel, eds. Asia Society. 2004. pp. 217–231.
Greene, M. (2016). The Game People Played: Mahjong in Modern Chinese Society and Culture. Cross-Currents: East Asian History and Culture Review, 5(1), 1–27. doi:10.1353/ach.2016.0001
 Stanwick, Michael, ‘Mahjong(g) Before Mahjong(g): Part 1’. In: The Playing-Card, Vol. 32, No. 4, 2004, pp. 153–162.
 Stanwick, Michael, ‘Mahjong(g) Before Mahjong(g): Part 2’. In: The Playing-Card, Vol. 32, No. 5, 2004, pp. 206–215.
 Stanwick, Michael, ‘Mahjong(g), Before and After Mahjong(g): Part 1’. In: The Playing-Card, Vol. 34, No. 4, 2006, pp. 259–268.
 Stanwick, Michael, ‘Mahjong(g), Before and After Mahjong(g): Part 2’. In: The Playing-Card, Vol. 35, No. 1, 2006, pp. 27–39.
 Stanwick, Michael and Xu, Hongbing, 'Flowers and Kings: A Hypothesis of their Function in Early Ma Que'. In: The Playing-Card, Vol. 37, No. 1, 2008, pp. 29–40.
 Stanwick, Michael and Xu, Hongbing, 'From Cards to Tiles: The Origin of Mahjong(g)'s Earliest Suit Names'. In: The Playing-Card, Vol. 41, No. 1, 2012, pp. 52–67.
 Wilkinson, William H.,(1890): Published in 1901 as pp 184–194 of Catalogue of the Collection of Playing Cards Bequeathed to the Trustees of the British Museum, F. M. O’Donoghue.
 Wilkinson, William H.,(1893): Published in Culin, Games of the Orient, Tuttle, 1958. First published under the title Korean Games, with Notes on the Corresponding Games of China and Japan, University of Pennsylvania, 1895.
 Wilkinson, William H., ‘Chinese Origin of Playing Cards’, in The American Anthropologist, Volume VIII, 1895, pp. 61–78. Can also be found at;

Chinese classic

Chinese official 

 Competition mahjong Official International Rulebook. Takeshobo: 2002. .
 Handbook for the Competitions of the Chinese MaJiang.  Organizing Committee of Chinese MaJiang: 2005.
 Hatsune, Mai and Takunori Kajimoto, translation by Ryan Morris World-Class Mahjong with World Champion Mai Hatsune: 2005.
 Pritchard, David B., The New mahjong. Right Way: 2004. .

External links 

 
 

 
Chinese games
Gambling games
Traditional board games
Articles containing video clips
1920s fads and trends